Rugby sevens was introduced as a World Games sport for men at the 2001 World Games in Akita. No women's rugby has been played at the World Games.

The 2013 World Games was the last to feature the sport, with rugby sevens becoming a full Olympic event in 2016.

Medalists

Tournament finals

See also
 Rugby sevens at the Summer Olympics
 Rugby sevens at the Pan American Games

References

 
Sports at the World Games
World Games
Defunct rugby union competitions for national teams